The British Journal of Politics and International Relations is a  quarterly peer-reviewed academic journal published by SAGE Publications on behalf of the Political Studies Association. It was established in 1999.

Until 2016, the journal was published by Wiley-Blackwell. As of February 2015, its editors-in-chief are John Peterson and Alan Convery (University of Edinburgh).

According to the Journal Citation Reports, the journal has a 2015 impact factor of 1.423, ranking it 41st out of 163 journals in the category "Political Science" and 21st out of 86 journals in the category "International Relations". It is thus the highest ranking journal in this domain (by most measures) to be published in the UK.

See also 
 List of political science journals
 List of international relations journals

References

External links 
 

Political science journals
SAGE Publishing academic journals
English-language journals
Quarterly journals
Publications established in 1999
Academic journals associated with learned and professional societies of the United Kingdom